Rudrasen II was ruler of the Western Kshatrapas (256–278) in today's north-west India. He was preceded by Damajadasri III and succeeded by Visvasimha.

Western Satraps
3rd-century Indian monarchs